Valerie Sheila Gaunt (26 June 1932 – 27 November 2016) was a British actress.

She graduated from RADA in 1951, and appeared subsequently in repertory theatre.

Valerie Gaunt was best known for her appearances in the 1957 and 1958 Hammer horror films The Curse of Frankenstein and Dracula, both starring Christopher Lee and
Peter Cushing. She won the first role after director Terence Fisher saw her in an episode of BBC TV's Dixon of Dock Green. She only appeared in the two films and in two television shows before marrying the stockbroker, later Rev., Gerald Alfred Reddington
, and leaving acting in 1958.

Death
Gaunt died on 27 November 2016 on the Isle of Wight at the age of 84.

Filmography

References

External links
 

1932 births
2016 deaths
British film actresses
British television actresses
20th-century British actresses
People from Stratford-upon-Avon
Alumni of RADA